Hodbeh (also Romanized as Ḩodbeh) is a village in Salami Rural District, Khanafereh District, Shadegan County, Khuzestan Province, Iran. At the 2006 census, its population was 603, in 61 families.

References 

Populated places in Shadegan County